Andrew Martinez (March 11, 1983 – January 11, 2009), better known as Andy DeMize, was an American musician. Martinez was the drummer for the  bands Nekromantix, Up Syndrome, and The Rocketz.

Biography
Martinez started playing drums at the age of 9, influenced by his older brothers, Aaron (a drummer) and Alex (a guitarist)—both members of a rockabilly/cumbia group, the Moonlight Cruisers. Other influential drummers: Wade Youman (Unwritten Law) and John Bonham (Led Zeppelin).

Martinez joined the pop punk group Up Syndrome in October 2001; the band signed with Nitro Records in December 2002, but were dropped by the label before releasing anything. The group broke up while still in pre-production for their debut album, in July 2003.

Martinez and Tony "Slash" Red-Horse formed The Rocketz in December 2003.

In May 2006, Martinez replaced James Meza as the drummer for the Nekromantix. Martinez made his album debut with the group on Life Is a Grave & I Dig It!.

Death 

In the early morning of January 11, 2009 Martinez died in an automobile accident. According to reports by the Orange County Register, Martinez and three other people were in a 1972 Chevrolet Nova travelling south on Route 57 outside of Fullerton, California at roughly  when the driver lost control, swerved across all lanes of the freeway, went over an embankment, and hit a tree. The car caught fire, igniting a eucalyptus grove. According to police reports, Martinez and another passenger were killed while the driver and a third passenger escaped the vehicle and fled the scene, later calling 9-1-1 from a nearby strawberry field asking for medical help. The driver was arrested on suspicion of driving under the influence of alcohol, vehicular manslaughter while intoxicated, and felony hit-and-run. He and the third passenger were taken to the University of California, Irvine Medical Center where they were listed in critical condition.

Martinez's bandmates were quick to respond to news of his death. Nekromantix frontman Kim Nekroman remarked: "My thoughts and condolences go out to his family and everybody that knew Andrew. There [are] no words to describe the shock ... Andrew was probably the most loveable guy I ever met and truely the only person I've met in my life that was loved and liked by everybody [he] met." Tony Slash of The Rocketz remarked that "Andy touched many people, his heart was golden, his reputation as a truly nice guy was understated ... he was always quick to offer a hand or a beer. He was more than just the backbone of The Rocketz ... he was the bond that kept everyone together, he was like a son to me." Chris Piliero of Up Syndrome reflected on his relationship with Martinez: "I didn't stay in touch with Andrew all that much. The last I spoke to him was a year and half ago. I remember him telling me about his new bands (he was in a couple) and touring in other countries and I told him about my video production company and shared what I was up to and for that brief moment, we reconciled our differences and genuinely were happy for each other and wished each other good luck with what we were working on. That was it... Our friendship got tainted by the way we ended things with the band and it's really unfortunate. We shared so many good times together ..."

Albums

Music videos

See also 
List of drummers

References

External links 

 Andy DeMize on Myspace

1983 births
2009 deaths
American rock drummers
American musicians of Mexican descent
Hispanic and Latino American musicians
People from Hacienda Heights, California
Road incident deaths in California
20th-century American drummers
American male drummers
20th-century American male musicians
21st-century American drummers
21st-century American male musicians